Rose Hill (also called Rosehill) was an unincorporated community along a railroad at the border between Kosciusko County, Indiana, and Wabash County, Indiana. The extinct community's church and cemetery, in Wabash County, remain. The Rose Hill Post Office was established by 1870. United States Post Office Department Official Postal Guides through 1881 listed the Rose Hill Post Office as being in Kosciusko County, and afterwards in Wabash County. The Rose Hill Post Office was discontinued by about 1906.

References

Post office buildings in the United States
Wabash County, Indiana